Bronikowski is a Polish surname:
 Friedrich von Oppeln-Bronikowski (1873–1936), a German writer, translator, publisher and cultural historian
 Hermann (Leopold August) von Oppeln-Bronikowski (1899–1966), a German military commander
 Franciszek (Jan) Bronikowski (1907–1964), a Polish rower

See also 
 Von Oppeln-Bronikowski

Polish-language surnames